Legislative elections were held in New Caledonia on 9 May 2004 to elect members of Congress. Although the Rally for Caledonia in the Republic and Future Together both won 16 seats, Future Together's Marie-Noëlle Thémereau became President.

Results

References

Elections in New Caledonia
New Caledonia
2004 in New Caledonia
New Caledonia